Kalyna may refer to:

 Kalyna (cipher), a symmetric block cipher
 Kalyna Country, a heritage and eco-tourism district in Alberta, Canada
 Viburnum opulus,  a species of flowering plant

People
 Kalyna Roberge (born 1986), Canadian short-track speed skater
 Svyatoslav Palamar (born 1982), nicknamed Kalyna, Ukrainian military leader

See also
 Kalina (disambiguation)